Corsaro II is a yawl, active as a sail training vessel for the Italian Navy

Characteristics 
Designed by Sparkman & Stephens Designs New York City (United States), project 1505, Corsano II for the RORC 1st class, is a Bermudan-rig yawl, sister of Stella Polare, commissioned by Italian Navy to be used as a training ship for the cadets at the Italian Naval Academy in Livorno, Italy.
She is constructed of wood; iroko keelson, acacia frames and double planked of Philippine mahogany.
The ship's fasteners are silicon bronze, spars are of sitka spruce.
Original engine Mercedes Benz OM/321 (96 HP) was then replaced by an FIAT AIFO engine.

Each year she embarks on a training cruise which often includes calls to various classic sailing rallies and regattas.

History
Corsaro II can accommodate 16 persons. First Commander of the ship was Agostino Straulino, who won the 1952 Olympic Games in the class Star. In 1961 Corsaro II was the only naval ship to join in the Los Angeles - Honolulu classifying sixth in real time. In 1962 participated in the Newport – Bermuda with 138 boats arriving at the sixth place, and in the Torbay – Rotterdam arriving first in the class. In 1963 participated in: Annapolis – Newport, Newport – Plymouth (second place), the Channel Race and the Fastnet Race. In 1964 took part in the Lisbon – Canaries – Bermuda reaching the first place. In 1965 participated in the Buenos Aires – Rio de Janeiro then sailed to Sydney racing in local regatta. The following year sailed from Sydney to San Diego coming to Italy. From then on the Corsaro II participated mainly in the Mediterranean sea with home port in La Spezia.

References

External links
Corsaro II (A 5316) Marina Militare website

Ships built in Italy
Training ships of the Italian Navy
1960 ships
Sail training
Tall ships of Italy
Yawls